Trevor Steyn (born 30 November 1934) is a South African rower. He competed in the men's coxless four event at the 1960 Summer Olympics.

References

1934 births
Living people
South African male rowers
Olympic rowers of South Africa
Rowers at the 1960 Summer Olympics